This is a list of Bulgarian football transfers in the summer transfer window of 2009, sorted by club. Only transfers of the A PFG clubs are listed.

Levski Sofia

In:

Out:

CSKA Sofia

In:

Out:

Cherno More Varna

In:

Out:

Litex Lovech

In:

Out:

Lokomotiv Sofia

In:

Out:

Lokomotiv Plovdiv

In:

Out:

Chernomorets Burgas

In:

Out:

Lokomotiv Mezdra

In:

Out:

Slavia Sofia

In:

Out:

Pirin Blagoevgrad

In:

Out:

Minyor Pernik

In:

Out:

OFC Sliven 2000

In:

Out:

Botev Plovdiv

In:

Out:

PFC Montana

In:

Out:

Beroe Stara Zagora

In:

Out:

Sportist Svoge

In:

Out:

References

Bulgaria
Summer 2009